700 series may refer to:
 700 Series Shinkansen, Japanese high-speed train
 N700 Series Shinkansen, Japanese high-speed train
 Choshi Electric Railway 700 series electric multiple unit train
 GeForce 700 Series of graphics processing units
 Keikyu 700 series (1956), electric trains operated by Keikyu in Japan from 1956, and later reclassified 600 series
 Keikyu 700 series, electric trains operated by Keikyu in Japan from 1967 to 2005
 IBM 700 series, vacuum tube digital computers in the 1960s
 IdeaPad 700, a discontinued brand of notebook computers, same as Lenovo's IdeaPad 100
 ThinkPad 700 series, a line of laptop computers

See also
 Series 7 (disambiguation)
 7000 series (disambiguation)